SM UB-125 was a German Type UB III submarine or U-boat in the German Imperial Navy during World War I. She was commissioned into the German Imperial Navy on 18 May 1918 as SM UB-125.

UB-125 was surrendered 20 November 1918 in accordance with the requirements of the Armistice with Germany. Handed over to Japan, she served as O-6 in the Imperial Japanese Navy until 1921 when she was broken up in Kure.

Construction

She was built by AG Weser of Bremen and following just under a year of construction, launched at Bremen on 16 April 1918. UB-125 was commissioned later the same year under the command of Kptlt. Fritz Schubert. Like all Type UB III submarines, UB-125 carried 10 torpedoes and was armed with a  deck gun. UB-125 had a displacement of  while surfaced and  when submerged. Her engines enabled her to travel at  when surfaced and  when submerged.

Summary of raiding history

References

Notes

Citations

Bibliography 

 

German Type UB III submarines
World War I submarines of Germany
U-boats commissioned in 1918
1918 ships
Ships built in Bremen (state)
Foreign submarines of the Imperial Japanese Navy